This is a list of places named after the first guru of Sikhs, Guru Nanak Dev Ji.

Educational institutions

Educational Institutions in India

University 
  Guru Nanak Dev University, Amritsar
 Guru Nanak Open University Patiala

Colleges and Institutes 
 Guru Nanak Institute of Management and Technology (GNIMT) Ludhiana 
 Gujranwala Guru Nanak Khalsa College (Boys) Ludhiana 
 Gujranwala Guru Nanak Khalsa College (Girls) Ludhiana
 Guru Nanak Girls College, Model Town  (Girls) Ludhiana 
 Guru Nanak National College (Girls) Nakodar
 Guru Nanak National College (Boys) Nakodar
 Guru Nanak Dev University, Amritsar
 Guru Nanak Dev Engineering College, Ludhiana
 Guru Nanak Dev Engineering College, Bidar
 Guru Nanak Khalsa College (King's Circle), Mumbai
 Guru Nanak Dev Dental College and Research Institute, Sunam
 Guru Nanak Engineering College, Ibrahimpatnam, RR District, Andhra Pradesh 
 Guru Nanak Institute of Technology (GNIT), Ibrahimpatnam  
 Guru Nanak College, Chennai
 Guru Nanak Dev Institute of Technology, Sector-15, Rohini, Delhi
 Guru Nanak college, Firozpur cantt, Punjab, India
 Guru Nanak Institute of Engineering & Technology, Nagpur 
 Guru Nanak Dev Polytechnic College, Ludhiana 
 Guru Nanak Khalsa College, Yamuna Nagar 
 Sri Guru Nanak Dev Khalsa College, Dev Nagar, Karol Bagh, New Delhi
 Guru Nanak College of Education, Punjabi Bagh, Road No. 75, New Delhi 
 Guru Nanak Institute of Management, New Delhi (GNIM)

Schools 
 Guru Nanak Public School, Punjabi Bagh, New Delhi
 Guru Nanak Public School, Sector 36, Chandigarh
 Guru Nanak Institute of Dental Sciences and Research, Kolkata.

Educational Institutions outside India 
 Guru Nanak Sikh Academy, London, England
  Baba Guru Nanak University, Nankana Sahib, Pakistan

Gurdwaras 
 Gurdwara Nanak Jhira Sahib, BIDAR, Karnataka, India
Gurdwara Guru Nanak Darbar - Medford, MA
 Guru Nanak NSJ, Soho Road, Birmingham
  Guru Nanak Darbar, Dubai UAE
  Guru Nanak Khalsa College Matunga, Mumbai 19.
 Gurdwara Sahib Klang, Malaysia
 Gurdwara Guru Nanak Sahib, Brussels (Vilvoorde) Belgium

Others 
 Guru Nanak Dev Thermal Plant, Bathinda
 Guru Nanak Home for Handicapped Children
 Guru Nanak pura, Gujranwala, Punjab, Pakistan.
 Guru Nanak Sacred Forests (Guru Nanak Bagichi), Mathura

See also 
Sikh gurus
Sikh religious philosophy

References 

Memorials to Guru Nanak

Sikhism-related lists
Monuments and memorials in India
Guru Nanak Dev
Guru Nanak Dev